The Most Honourable Order of the Distinguished Rule of Izzuddin (Dhivehi: Nishan Izzuddin Izzathuge Verikan)  is the highest Maldivian honour which may be conferred upon a foreign national.

Insignia
The collar is made of gold with alternating eight-pointed gold stars with green centres, each with a gold upward-pointing crescent encircling a gold five-pointed star, and eight-pointed gold stars with white crescents.
The badge is an eight-pointed gold star with a green centre, in the middle of which is a white upward-curving crescent encircling two crossed national flags in gold. 
The sash is worn passing from the right shoulder to the left hip, the badge being pinned on the sash at the left hip. The sash is red with a narrow centre stripe of dark green with white edges. A smaller version of the badge is worn on the collar.

Recipients
Prince Philip, Duke of Edinburgh
Admiral of the Fleet Louis Mountbatten, 1st Earl Mountbatten of Burma (1972)
President of South Korea Chun Doo-hwan (1984)
Secretary-General of the Commonwealth of Nations Sir Shridath Ramphal (1989)
Prince Talal bin Abdulaziz Al Saud of Saudi Arabia (2009)
Abdul Sattar Moosa Didi (2011)
President of Palestine Mahmoud Abbas (2013)
Prime Minister of India Narendra Modi (2019)

References

Orders, decorations, and medals of the Maldives
Orders of chivalry awarded to heads of state, consorts and sovereign family members